The 1959 Mexico hurricane was the deadliest Pacific hurricane on record. First observed south of Mexico on October 23, the cyclone tracked northwestward. It intensified into a Category 3 hurricane on October 25 and reached Category 4 intensity on the following day. After turning toward the northeast, the hurricane made landfall near Manzanillo, Mexico at peak intensity. The system continued on that trajectory before dissipating on the next day.

Impact from the hurricane was severe and widespread. Initially forecast to remain offshore, the system curved northeast and moved ashore, becoming one of Mexico's worst natural disasters at the time. Up to 150 boats were submerged. Countless homes in Colima and Jalisco were damaged or destroyed, large portions of the states were inaccessible by flash flooding, and hundreds of residents were stranded. All coconut plantations were blown down during the storm, leaving thousands without work and instating fear that it would take the economy years to recover. Torrential rainfall across mountain terrain contributed to numerous mudslides that caused hundreds of fatalities. In the aftermath of the cyclone, convoys delivering aid were hindered by the destruction. Residents were vaccinated to prevent the spread of disease. Overall, the hurricane inflicted at least $280 million (1959 USD) in damage.

Meteorological history

On October 22, a low pressure area was present south of the Gulf of Tehuantepec, having originated out of an area of disturbed weather in the region the day before. That day, two ships reported gale-force winds, suggesting that a tropical storm formed by 12:00 UTC. Moving west-northwestward parallel to the southwest coast of Mexico, the system steadily intensified, reaching hurricane status by late on October 23. The storm continued to intensify, although there were few ships in the path to record the intensity until October 26.

On October 26, the hurricane turned abruptly to the northeast toward the Mexican coast. At around 12:00 UTC on October 27, the hurricane made landfall just northwest of Manzanillo, Colima, with an eye  in diameter. The hurricane rapidly weakened over the mountainous terrain of southwestern Mexico. Within 12 hours of landfall, the system weakened to tropical storm status, and on October 28, the storm dissipated.

Preparations and impact

Thousands of people were unprepared for the storm. Thus, the system was dubbed "a sneak hurricane". After passing well offshore from Acapulco, it was forecast to head out to sea. Instead, it recurved eastward and made landfall.

The hurricane had devastating effects on the places it hit. It killed at least 1,000 people directly, and a total of 1,800 people. At that time, it was Mexico's worst natural disaster in recent times. Most of the destruction was in Colima and Jalisco. A preliminary estimate of property damage was $280 million (1959 USD).

The storm sank three merchant ships, and two other vessels. On one ship, the Sinaloa, 21 of 38 hands went down. On another, the El Caribe, all hands were lost. As many as 150 total boats were sunk.

A quarter of the homes in Cihuatlán, Jalisco, were totally destroyed, leaving many homeless. In Manzanillo, Colima, 40 percent of all homes were destroyed, and four ships in the harbor were sunk. Large portions of Colima and Jalisco were isolated by flooding. Hundreds of people were stranded. Minatitlán, Colima, suffered especially, as 800 people out of its population of 1000 were dead or missing, according to a message sent to President Adolfo López Mateos. In Colima, all coconut plantations were blown down and thousands of people were left out of work. That state's economy was damaged enough that officials thought it would take years to recover.

The hurricane also dumped heavy rains along its path. This water-logged the hills near Minatitlán, and contributed to huge mudslide late on October 29 that claimed 800 victims. The slide uncovered hundreds of venomous scorpions and snakes, which killed tens more people in the aftermath. Additional hordes of scorpions were driven from their nests when the adobe walls crumbled away. The Governor of Colima, Rodolfo Chávez Carrillo and his wife issued a plea for venom inoculations afterwards. Water supplies were badly polluted, both by debris and dead bodies.

Aftermath
In the aftermath, air rescue operations were conducted, but the destruction of roads in the area hindered convoys carrying aid. Planes also made supply drops, but rescue operations were hindered by broken roads and rails. Survivors were vaccinated against typhoid and tetanus. Part of Manzanillo was placed under quarantine.

See also

 Hurricane Madeline (1976) – one of the strongest landfalling Pacific hurricanes
 Hurricane Patricia – the strongest Pacific hurricane on record, taking a similar path in 2015

References

1959 Pacific hurricane season
Pacific hurricanes in Mexico
1959 in Mexico
Category 4 Pacific hurricanes
October 1959 events in Mexico